Novotitarovskaya culture, also known as the Novotitorovka culture, was a Bronze Age archaeological culture which flourished in the North Caucasus ca. 3300–2700 BC.

The Novotitarovskaya culture was located immediately to the north of and largely overlapping portions of the Maykop culture facing the Sea of Azov, running from the Kerch Strait eastwards, almost to the Caspian, roughly coterminous with the modern Krasnodar Krai region of Russia.

It is distinguished by its burials, particularly by the presence of wagons in them and its own distinct pottery, as well as a richer collection of metal objects than those found in adjacent cultures, as is to be expected considering its relationship to the Maykop culture.

It is grouped with the larger Yamnaya culture complex, often supposed as bearer of the Indo-European languages. In common with it, the economy was semi-nomadic pastoralism mixed with some agriculture.

Notes

Sources

Further reading

 

Indo-European archaeological cultures
Archaeological cultures of Eastern Europe
Archaeological cultures in Russia
Bronze Age cultures of Europe
Archaeological cultures of the Caucasus
Archaeology of Kuban
History of Krasnodar Krai